Richard Vaněk (born 11 June 1991) is a professional Czech football player who currently plays for Fotbal Třinec.

References

External links
 

1991 births
Living people
Czech footballers
Czech First League players
FC Baník Ostrava players
Association football midfielders
Czech National Football League players
FK Fotbal Třinec players
MFK Karviná players
FK Frýdek-Místek players
MFK Vítkovice players